Grace Marion Frick (January 12, 1903 – November 18, 1979) was a translator and researcher for her lifelong partner French writer Marguerite Yourcenar. Grace Frick taught languages at US colleges and was the second academic dean to be appointed to Hartford Junior College.

Early life
Grace Marion Frick was born in Toledo, Ohio, on January 12, 1903. The family later moved to Kansas City, Missouri.

Frick attended Wellesley College, receiving her bachelor's in 1925 and in 1927 earning a master's degree in English. She worked on a dissertation at Yale University, starting in 1937, the same year she met Yourcenar in Paris, and completed academic work at University of Kansas.

Career
Frick is most remembered for being the translator from French into English of Memoirs of Hadrian, The Abyss and Coup de Grâce by Marguerite Yourcenar. Until Frick's death, Yourcenar allowed only her to translate her books.

She taught at Stephens Junior College for Women (now Stephens College), Columbia, Missouri, and at Barnard College, New York City. After Yourcenar's arrival, in 1940, Frick became the second academic dean of Hartford Junior College (later Hartford College for Women), until 1943, and they moved together at 549 Prospect Ave, West Hartford. Other than administrative duties, Frick also taught English. After Hartford, Frick taught at Connecticut College for Women (now Connecticut College), New London, Connecticut.

While in Hartford, Frick and Yourcenar were active in the arts community that originated around the Wadsworth Atheneum headed by Arthur Everett Austin, Jr.

Personal life
She met Marguerite Yourcenar in the February of 1937 at the Wagram Hotel, Paris. They fell madly in love with one another and in 1939 Grace invited Marguerite to come live with her in the United States which also allowed her to escape the imminent war happening in Europe.
Grace Frick and Yourcenar lived together for forty years until Frick died of cancer on November 18, 1979.

Together they bought a house, "Petite Plaisance", in 1950 in Northeast Harbor, Maine, on Mount Desert Island. The two companions spoke French at home, loved horseback riding and lived a quiet life. They are both buried at Brookside Cemetery, Mount Desert, Maine. Alongside them is a memorial plaque for Jerry Wilson, the last companion of Yourcenar, who died of AIDS in 1986.

References

1903 births
1979 deaths
LGBT people from Ohio
Writers from Toledo, Ohio
Writers from Kansas City, Missouri
LGBT people from Missouri
LGBT academics
American LGBT writers
Wellesley College alumni
University of Kansas alumni
Stephens College faculty
Connecticut College faculty
20th-century American translators
20th-century American LGBT people